The American Forces Information Service (AFIS) was a United States Department of Defense-providing news service that supplied information about the U.S. military.

History

In 1952 the Office of the Secretary of Defense established the Office of Armed Forces Information and Education. In 1977 AFIS was established. AFIS was originally responsible for the Armed Forces Information Program as well as the Armed Forces Radio and Television Service.

Department of Defense Directive 5105.74 disestablished AFIS on October 1, 2008, and created the Defense Media Activity.  The DMA provides news stories about military operations worldwide and includes all the military service media centers, Stars and Stripes newspapers as well as the American Forces Radio and Television Service and its American Forces Network (AFN).

References

John Hickman. "Finding the Words: A Content Analysis of American Forces Information Service Reporting on the War in Afghanistan", South Asian Journal of Socio-Political Studies. Vol. 7, No. 1 (July-Dec. 2006), pp. 6–8, 14.

External links

AFIS

United States Department of Defense agencies
2008 disestablishments in the United States